A management information system (MIS) is an information system used for decision-making, and for the coordination, control, analysis, and visualization of information in an organization. The study of the management information systems involves people, processes and technology in an organizational context.

In a corporate setting, the ultimate goal of using management information system is to increase the value and profits of the business.

History 
While it can be contested that the history of management information system dates as far back as companies using ledgers to keep track of accounting, the modern history of MIS can be divided into five eras originally identified by Kenneth C. Laudon and Jane Laudon in their seminal textbook Management Information Systems.

 First Era – Mainframe and minicomputer computing
 Second Era – Personal computers
 Third Era – Client/server networks
 Fourth Era – Enterprise computing 
 Fifth Era – Cloud computing

The first era (mainframe and minicomputer computing) was ruled by IBM and their mainframe computers for which they supplied both the hardware and software. These computers would often take up whole rooms and require teams to run them. As technology advanced, these computers were able to handle greater capacities and therefore reduce their cost. Smaller, more affordable minicomputers allowed larger businesses to run their own computing centers in-house / on-site / on-premises.

The second era (personal computers) began in 1965 as microprocessors started to compete with mainframes and minicomputers and accelerated the process of decentralizing computing power from large data centers to smaller offices. In the late 1970s, minicomputer technology gave way to personal computers and relatively low-cost computers were becoming mass market commodities, allowing businesses to provide their employees access to computing power that ten years before would have cost tens of thousands of dollars. This proliferation of computers created a ready market for interconnecting networks and the popularization of the Internet. (The first microprocessor—a four-bit device intended for a programmable calculator—was introduced in 1971, and microprocessor-based systems were not readily available for several years. The MITS Altair 8800 was the first commonly known microprocessor-based system, followed closely by the Apple I and II. It is arguable that the microprocessor-based system did not make significant inroads into minicomputer use until 1979, when VisiCalc prompted record sales of the Apple II on which it ran. The IBM PC introduced in 1981 was more broadly palatable to business, but its limitations gated its ability to challenge minicomputer systems until perhaps the late 1980s to early 1990s.)

The third era (client/server networks) arose as technological complexity increased, costs decreased, and the end-user (now the ordinary employee) required a system to share information with other employees within an enterprise. Computers on a common network shared information on a server. This lets thousands and even millions of people access data simultaneously on networks referred to as Intranets.

The fourth era (enterprise computing) enabled by high speed networks, consolidated the original department specific software applications into integrated software platforms referred to as enterprise software. This new platform tied all aspects of the business enterprise together offering rich information access encompassing the complete management structure.

Technology 
The terms management information system (MIS), Information management system (IMS), information system (IS), enterprise resource planning (ERP), computer science, electrical computer engineering, and information technology management (IT) are often confused. MIS is a hierarchical subset of information systems. MIS are more organization-focused narrowing in on leveraging information technology to increase business value. Computer science is more software-focused dealing with the applications that may be used in MIS. Electrical computer engineering is product-focused mainly dealing with the hardware architecture behind computer systems. ERP software is a subset of MIS and IT management refers to the technical management of an IT department which may include MIS.

A career in MIS focuses on understanding and projecting the practical use of management information systems. It studies the interaction, organization and processes among technology, people and information to solve problems.

Management 
While management information systems can be used by any or every level of management, the decision of which systems to implement generally falls upon the chief information officers (CIO) and chief technology officers (CTO). These officers are generally responsible for the overall technology strategy of an organization including evaluating how new technology can help their organization. They act as decision-makers in the implementation process of new MIS.

Once decisions have been made, IT directors, including MIS directors, are in charge of the technical implementation of the system. They are also in charge of implementing the policies affecting the MIS (either new specific policies passed down by the CIOs or CTOs or policies that align the new systems with the organization's overall IT policy). It is also their role to ensure the availability of data and network services as well as the security of the data involved by coordinating IT activities.

Upon implementation, the assigned users will have the appropriate access to relevant information. It is important to note that not everyone inputting data into MIS need necessarily be management level. It is common practice to have inputs to MIS be inputted by non-managerial employees though they rarely have access to the reports and decision support platforms offered by these systems.

Types 
The following are types of information systems used to create reports, extract data, and assist in the decision making processes of middle and operational level managers.

 Decision support systems (DSSs) are computer program applications used by middle and higher management to compile information from a wide range of sources to support problem solving and decision making. A DSS is used mostly for semi-structured and unstructured decision problems.
 Executive information system (EIS) is a reporting tool that provides quick access to summarized reports coming from all company levels and departments such as accounting, human resources and operations.
 Marketing information systems are management Information Systems designed specifically for managing the marketing aspects of the business.
Accounting information systems are focused accounting functions.
Human resource management systems are used for personnel aspects.
 Office automation systems (OAS) support communication and productivity in the enterprise by automating workflow and eliminating bottlenecks. OAS may be implemented at any and all levels of management.
 School Information Management Systems (SIMS) cover school administration, often including teaching and learning materials.
 Enterprise resource planning (ERP) software facilitates the flow of information between all business functions inside the boundaries of the organization and manage the connections to outside stakeholders.
 Local databases, can be small, simplified tools for managers and are considered to be a primal or base level version of a MIS.

Advantages and disadvantages 
The following are some of the benefits that can be attained using MIS:
 Improve an organization's operational efficiency, add value to existing products, engender innovation and new product development, and help managers make better decisions.
 Companies are able to identify their strengths and weaknesses due to the presence of revenue reports, employee performance records etc. Identifying these aspects can help a company improve its business processes and operations.
 The availability of customer data and feedback can help the company to align its business processes according to the needs of its customers. The effective management of customer data can help the company to perform direct marketing and promotion activities.
MIS can help a company gain a competitive advantage.
MIS reports can help with decision-making as well as reduce downtime for actionable items.

Some of the disadvantages of MIS systems:

 Retrieval and dissemination are dependent on technology hardware and software.
 Potential for inaccurate information.

Enterprise applications 
 Enterprise systems—also known as enterprise resource planning (ERP) systems—provide integrated software modules and a unified database that personnel use to plan, manage, and control core business processes across multiple locations. Modules of ERP systems may include finance, accounting, marketing, human resources, production, inventory management, and distribution.
 Supply chain management (SCM) systems enable more efficient management of the supply chain by integrating the links in a supply chain. This may include suppliers, manufacturers, wholesalers, retailers, and final customers.
 Customer relationship management (CRM) systems help businesses manage relationships with potential and current customers and business partners across marketing, sales, and service.
 Knowledge management system (KMS) helps organizations facilitate the collection, recording, organization, retrieval, and dissemination of knowledge. This may include documents, accounting records, unrecorded procedures, practices, and skills. Knowledge management (KM) as a system covers the process of knowledge creation and acquisition from internal processes and the external world. The collected knowledge is incorporated in organizational policies and procedures, and then disseminated to the stakeholders.

See also 

 Bachelor of Computer Information Systems
 Business intelligence
 Business management tools
 Business performance management
 Business rule
 Corporate governance of information technology
 Data mining
 Predictive analytics
 Purchase order request
 Enterprise architecture
 Enterprise information system
 Enterprise planning system
 Management by objectives
 Online analytical processing
 Online office suite
Real-time computing
 Real-time marketing

References

External links 

 MIS Links (University of York)
 Executive Information Systems: Minimising the risk of development

Business software
Decision support systems
Information systems
Information technology management
Management systems
School-administration software